The Maurício Dantas Private Natural Heritage Ecological Reserve is a private natural heritage reserve in the state of Pernambuco, Brazil. It protects an area of dry caatinga vegetation. It was created on 12 September 1997.

Location
The property has been fenced to deter hunters, who killed a jaguar there in 1975 without the owner's permission.
There are three families on the property practicing subsistence agriculture.

History
The Maurício  Dantas Private Natural Heritage Ecological Reserve was created by ordnance 104/97-N of 12 September 1997.
It was the first caatinga RPPN in Pernambuco.
The land is permanently protected, but the owners may use it for ecotourism, leisure, recreation and environmental education.
It is under federal oversight.
It became part of the Caatinga Ecological Corridor, created in 2006.

Environment
There was clear cutting 20 years before 2001.
A study between 2001 and 2006  found that most species of plant had fairly stable populations, but some increased or decreased considerably, perhaps due to continued  recovery from the clear cutting. There was a 13.5% increase in total number of plants, and increases in average diameter and above ground biomass. Fauna include tamandua, seriema, rock cavy, guan, collared peccary, fox and  possibly jaguar.

References

Sources

 
 
 
 
 
 

Private natural heritage reserves of Brazil
Protected areas of Pernambuco
1997 establishments in Brazil